Vitaly Viktorovich Melnikov (born 20 March 1990) is a Russian backstroke swimmer.

Career
At the 2013 European Short Course Swimming Championships, he won an individual silver medal in the 100 m backstroke and two medley relay gold medals, in the men's and mixed competitions, breaking world records in both medley events. Those results were annulled after a positive doping test of his samples taken during those European Championships. Melnikov was suspended from competitions in April 2014, and banned in March 2015 until 12 December 2015.

References

External links
 Vitaly Melnikov at i-swimmer.ru
 Vitaly MELNIKOV at the-sports.org
 

1990 births
Living people
Male backstroke swimmers
Russian male swimmers
Doping cases in swimming
Russian sportspeople in doping cases
Sportspeople from Voronezh